Emamzadeh Aqaali Abbas Rural District is a rural district (dehestan) in Emamzadeh District, Natanz County, Isfahan Province, Iran. At the 2006 census, its population was 2,174, in 613 families.  The rural district has 9 villages.

References 

Rural Districts of Isfahan Province
Natanz County